The Internet Corporation for Assigned Names and Numbers (ICANN) holds periodic public meetings rotated between continents for the purpose of encouraging global participation in its processes.

The following is a list of ICANN meetings:

References

Internet governance organizations